"Running Out" is a single recorded by Norwegian DJ and music producer Matoma and Norwegian singer-songwriter Astrid S.

Music video
The official music video was published to YouTube on 31 March 2016.

Track listing

Charts

Weekly charts

Year-end charts

Certifications

References

External links

2015 songs
Matoma songs
Astrid S songs
Tropical house songs
Songs written by Matoma